Ellicott High School is a public high school in Ellicott, Colorado, United States. It is part of the Ellicott School District 22.

Athletics

Teams 
Ellicott's athletic teams are nicknamed the Thunderhawks and the school's colors are purple, gold, and white. Ellicott teams compete in the following sports:

 Baseball
 Basketball
 Boys' soccer
 Cross Country
 Football
 Volleyball
 Track
 Wrestling
 Girls' soccer

State championships 
 Girls' basketball
 1994 Colorado AA State Champions
 1995 Colorado AA State Champions

References

External links 
 

Schools in El Paso County, Colorado
Public high schools in Colorado